The Trevín government was the regional government of Asturias led by President Antonio Trevín. It was formed in June 1995 after the resignation of Juan Luis Rodríguez-Vigil due to the Petromocho scandal.

Investiture

Composition

References

Cabinets of Asturias
Cabinets established in 1993